Phthiria  is a genus of 'bee flies' belonging to the family Bombyliidae.

Species
Species within this genus include:

 Phthiria alberthessei
 Phthiria albida
 Phthiria albogilva
 Phthiria aldrichi
 Phthiria amplicella
 Phthiria asiatica
 Phthiria atriceps
 Phthiria austrandina
 Phthiria aztec
 Phthiria barbatula
 Phthiria brunnescens
 Phthiria cana
 Phthiria canescens
 Phthiria chilena
 Phthiria cingulata
 Phthiria cognata
 Phthiria compressa
 Phthiria conocephala
 Phthiria consors
 Phthiria conspicua
 Phthiria crocogramma
 Phthiria dolorosa
 Phthiria exilis
 Phthiria fallax
 Phthiria fasciventris
 Phthiria freidbergi
 Phthiria freyi
 Phthiria fulva
 Phthiria gaedii
 Phthiria gracilis
 Phthiria grisea
 Phthiria hesperia
 Phthiria homochroma
 Phthiria hypoleuca
 Phthiria incisa
 Phthiria inconspicua
 Phthiria lacteipennis
 Phthiria laeta
 Phthiria lanigera
 Phthiria lazaroi
 Phthiria lucidipennis
 Phthiria lurida
 Phthiria maroccana
 Phthiria merlei
 Phthiria minuta
 Phthiria mixteca
 Phthiria mongolica
 Phthiria namaquensis
 Phthiria nigribarba
 Phthiria nitidigena
 Phthiria olmeca
 Phthiria ombriosus
 Phthiria ovalicornis
 Phthiria pilirostris
 Phthiria pubescens
 Phthiria pulchella
 Phthiria pulchripes
 Phthiria pulicaria
 Phthiria pulicarius
 Phthiria pulla
 Phthiria quadrinotata
 Phthiria rhomphaea
 Phthiria salmayensis
 Phthiria scutellaris
 Phthiria simmondsii
 Phthiria simonyi
 Phthiria socotrae
 Phthiria stictica
 Phthiria subnitens
 Phthiria tinctipennis
 Phthiria toltec
 Phthiria tricolor
 Phthiria tristis
 Phthiria umbripennis
 Phthiria vagans
 Phthiria variegata
 Phthiria varipes
 Phthiria virgata
 Phthiria xanthaspis

References 

Bombyliidae
Asilomorph flies of Europe